George Herbert Taylor (June 7, 1892 – January 16, 1965) was an American competition swimmer and water polo player who represented the United States at the 1920 Summer Olympics in Antwerp, Belgium.  Taylor swam in the preliminary heats of the men's 200-meter breaststroke and finished sixteenth overall.  He also played for the U.S. water polo team that finished sixth.

See also
 List of University of Wisconsin–Madison people

References

External links
 

1892 births
1965 deaths
American male breaststroke swimmers
Olympic swimmers of the United States
Olympic water polo players of the United States
Swimmers from Chicago
Swimmers at the 1920 Summer Olympics
Wisconsin Badgers men's swimmers
Water polo players at the 1920 Summer Olympics
American male water polo players
Water polo players from Chicago